Lütolf is a surname. People with the surname include:
Aloys Lütolf (1824–1879), Swiss Catholic ecclesiastical historian
Marc Lütolf (born 1987), Swiss association footballer
Matthias Lütolf, Swiss biomedical engineer 
Remo Lütolf (born 1980), Swiss breaststroke swimmer